Hon. Leonard Francis Tyrwhitt, MVO, MA (29 October 1863 - 7 July 1921) was a Canon of Windsor from 1910 to 1921

Family

He was born in 1863, the seventh son of Sir Henry Thomas Tyrwhitt, 3rd Baronet and Emma Harriett, Baroness Berners.

Career

He was educated at Magdalene College, Cambridge.

He was appointed:
Vicar of Fenton, Staffordshire 1897-1907.
Rector of Rolleston on Dove, Burton-on-Trent
Hon. Chaplain to Queen Victoria.
Chaplain in ordinary to Queen Victoria and King Edward VII.
Chaplain to the Forces 1914 - 1919

He was invested as a Member of the Royal Victorian Order in 1906.

He was appointed to the eleventh stall in St George's Chapel, Windsor Castle in 1910, and held the stall until 1921.

Notes 

1863 births
1921 deaths
Canons of Windsor
Alumni of Magdalene College, Cambridge
Members of the Royal Victorian Order